Finley is an unincorporated community in Taylor County, Kentucky, United States. It lies along Kentucky Route 289 and KY 634 north of the city of Campbellsville, the seat of Taylor County. Its elevation is 1,017 feet (310 m).

References

Unincorporated communities in Taylor County, Kentucky
Unincorporated communities in Kentucky